Hannah Chinyere Chukwu (born 7 July 2003) is a Hungarian professional squash player. As of March 2021, she was ranked number 150 in the world.

She secured the Hungarian no. 1 ranking before the age of 18.

References

2003 births
Living people
Hungarian squash players
People from Komárom
Hungarian people of Nigerian descent
Sportspeople from Komárom-Esztergom County
21st-century Hungarian women
Competitors at the 2022 World Games